Limbombe is a surname. Notable people with the surname include:

Anthony Limbombe (born 1994), Belgian footballer
Bryan Limbombe (born 2001), Belgian footballer
Stallone Limbombe (born 1991), Belgian footballer

See also